Flor Silvestre y las canciones de sus tríos favoritos (Flor Silvestre and Her/Your Favorite Trio Songs) is a studio album by Mexican singer Flor Silvestre, released in 1970 by Musart Records. It features Flor Silvestre's versions of twelve boleros that were popularized by Mexican trios in the 1950s.

Critical reception
Cashbox included the album in its Latin Picks section, praising it as a "masterpiece for lovers of Latin boleros". It lauded Flor Silvestre's soulful, sentimental singing style: "Multi-talented vocalist Flor Silvestre gives her heart and soul on this album of love songs. Most of the songs are old Latin standards. This LP was recorded in Mexico and the songs are beautifully suited to her style of singing". The review also noticed that Flor Silvestre "is backed by a fantastic trio with beautiful background vocals behind her", but warned that the "trio is not mentioned in the album liner notes".

Track listing
Side one

Side two

Release history

References

External links
 Y las canciones de sus tríos favoritos at AllMusic

1970 albums
Flor Silvestre albums
Musart Records albums
Spanish-language albums